Sagar Prakash Khatnani (born June 6, 1983) is a Spanish writer of Indian descent.

Biography 
Sagar Prakash was born in the city of Puerto de la Cruz on the island of Tenerife (Canary Islands). He studied for a Higher Level Training Course in Audiovisual Production, Radio Shows, and several courses of filmmaking and photography. He later studied International Technician Protocol in Madrid. After winning several competitions of literature, he decided to embark on writing of Amagi for more than six years, writing in the evenings and between the hours free from work.

His first book, Amagi, was published in Spain by Suma de Letras publishing house in 2013 and became a bestseller, both to be published later in Latin America. Sagar Prakash is also collaborator of the blog Migrated of newspaper El País.

In 2014, the City of Puerto de la Cruz proposed Sagar Prakash Khatnani for Premios "Joven Canarias" that year, prize that was finally granted. In June 2016 Amagi is also published in Italian by the publisher Tre60.

Works 
 Amagi (2013)

References

External links 
 Amagi, novela escrita por Sagar Prakash Khatnani

1983 births
21st-century Spanish writers
21st-century Spanish novelists
Writers from the Canary Islands
People from Puerto de la Cruz
Spanish people of Indian descent
Living people